The Wangan Green Turtle Tourism and Conservation Center is a conservation center for green sea turtles in Tungan Village, Wangan Township, Penghu County, Taiwan.

History

The center was set up in 1997. Up to 2015, the center has taken care of more than 250 rescued sea turtles, in which 150 of them have then been released back to the sea.

Architecture
The center was constructed with a shape of a turtle.

Exhibitions
The center exhibits the natural ecology in Wangan and exhibitions on turtles, environment and ecology. It often conduct sea turtle release events and sea turtle ecological conservation promotion.

See also
 List of tourist attractions in Taiwan

References

1997 establishments in Taiwan
Buildings and structures in Penghu County
Protected areas established in 1997
Protected areas of Taiwan
Tourist attractions in Penghu County
Turtle conservation organizations